John Walker a/k/a Joseph Frazier, was a private with Company D, 8th U.S. Cavalry of the United States Army, who received the Medal of Honor for "gallantry in action" in combat with Apache Indians during the Apache Wars, at Red Creek, Arizona in the Arizona Territory (a few miles north of the present-day Lake Pleasant Regional Park) on September 23, 1869. Eighteen Indians were reportedly killed, with more wounded. The Medal of Honor was issued on November 23, 1869. However, John Walker had an alias of "Joseph Frazier."  He reportedly deserted twice, with the final desertion in 1874.  John Walker was reportedly born in 1845 in Leon, Landes Forest, Aquitaine, France, while "Joseph Frazier" was reportedly born in Italy.  Sergeant Charles Harris and Corporal George Ferrari also received the Medal of Honor for bravery in that battle.

References
http://www.mohhsus.com/lost-to-history

1845 births
Year of death missing
American military personnel of the Indian Wars
United States Army Medal of Honor recipients
United States Army soldiers
American Indian Wars recipients of the Medal of Honor